Belleville-sur-Loire (literally Belleville on Loire) is a commune in the Cher department in the Centre-Val de Loire region of France.

Geography
The canal latéral à la Loire flows through the centre of the commune.

Population

Sights

 The church, dating from the twelfth century.
 Two chateaux, dating from the 15th and seventeenth century.
 Vestiges of Roman occupation.
 The nuclear power plant.

See also
Belleville Nuclear Power Plant
Communes of the Cher department

References

External links

Official website of Belleville sur Loire 
Val de Jazz Festival website 

Communes of Cher (department)
Berry, France